Polyurethane foam is a special material used for thermal insulation. It is a solid polymeric foam from polyurethane.

Flexible polyurethane foam
The so-called flexible polyurethane foam (FPF) is produced from the reaction of polyols and isocyanates, a process pioneered in 1937. FPF allows for some compression and resilience that provides a cushioning effect. Because of this property, it is often used in furniture, bedding, automotive seating, athletic equipment, packaging, footwear and carpets.

Space Shuttles
Polyurethane foam has been widely used to insulate fuel tanks on Space Shuttles. However, it requires a perfect application, as any air pocket, dirt or an uncovered tiny spot can knock it off due to extreme conditions of liftoff. Those conditions include violent vibrations, air friction and abrupt changes in temperature and pressure. For a perfect application of the foam there have been two obstacles: limitations related to wearing protective suits and masks by workers and inability to test for cracks before launch, such testing is done only by naked eye. The loss of foam caused the Space Shuttle Columbia disaster. According to the Columbia accident report, NASA officials found foam loss in over 80% of the 79 missions for which they have pictures. 

By 2009 researchers created a superior polyimide foam to insulate the reusable cryogenic propellant tanks of Space Shuttles.

References

Foams 
Thermal protection